Jae Liew (born 29 May 1990) is a Singaporean actress.

Early life and education 
Jae Liew was born on 29 May 1990 in Singapore. She has an older brother.

She graduated from Murdoch University with a bachelor's degree of communications.

Career 
In 2013, Liew made her acting debut as the female lead in Michelle Chong's film 3 Peas in a Pod. Alongside ex-U-KISS member Alexander Lee Eusebio and Fahrenheit member Calvin Chen she played Penny Yang, a university student.

Following the film's release, she was cast in a supporting role as a queen bee cheerleader for the Mediacorp's Channel 8 drama Scrum! (冲锋) with Singaporean actress Felicia Chin and Taiwanese actor Chris Lee.

In 2015, she was cast in supporting roles for Mediacorp's Channel 8 dramas, Tiger Mum and The Journey: Our Homeland. She was also one of the lead roles as Diana Tong on Mediacorp's Channel 5's drama, Tanglin, Singapore's first long-form drama television series.

Jae also appeared on the 2015 September cover of Singapore FHM magazine, marking its final issue in SPH Media.

In 2016, she took on the leading role in a Tamil telemovie, Muthar Kanave, which would later win the Best Telemovie at Pradhana Vizha 2016.

She made her first appearance on the cover of Singaporean magazine 8 Days in 2017, alongside cast member Nat Ho.

In 2018, Liew was chosen as one of the faces of Cyber Security Agency of Singapore (CSA)'s second awareness campaign 'Cyber Tips 4 U' together with local comedian, Suhaimi Yusof.

In 2020, Liew was cast in the second season of Derek, a spin-off from the police procedural television drama Code of Law, playing the roles of a pair of twins. Liew was praised for her portrayal of the twins by fellow cast member Rebecca Lim and Sinema.SG reviewers.

Filmography

Film

Television

Variety shows

Music video appearances

Awards and nominations

References

External links
 

1990 births
20th-century Singaporean people
21st-century Singaporean actresses
Actresses of Chinese descent
Living people
Murdoch University alumni
Singaporean film actresses
Singaporean television actresses